The Pivnichnyi Bridge or Northern Bridge is a structure in Kyiv, Ukraine, built in 1976. It is a cable-stayed bridge, designed by the architect Mikhail Krasnoshtein (later, Mikhail Asianov) and engineer G. B. Fux.

It is notable that as a result of Soviet-era state-sponsored anti-semitism, a non-Jewish architect from Kharkiv (A. V. Dobrovolsky) was brought in to take credit for the bridge's architecture just prior to the official opening of the bridge, and this remains the official record. This record forgery was approved by A. F. Bersheda, the Director of the Kyiv architecture bureau (KievSoyuzDorProekt) at the time.   

Until February 2018 the bridge was named Moskovskyi Bridge or Moscow Bridge. As part of Ukraine's current decommunization process the bridge was nominated to be renamed for almost a year prior to its new name.

Overview

The major feature of the bridge its pylon  in height. It is located on the Trukhaniv Island and providing support for the main span across Dnieper River.

It is a key structure on the northern end of the Kyiv Smaller Beltway, connecting Petrivka to the densely populated north-eastern residential neighborhoods. From the moment of its construction the bridge was built as a high-speed motorway, which it remains to this day.

See also
 Bridges in Kyiv

References

External links

Road bridges in Kyiv
Bridges built in the Soviet Union
Landmarks in Kyiv
Bridges on Trukhaniv Island
Bridges completed in 1976
Bridges over the Dnieper
Cable-stayed bridges in Ukraine
Obolonskyi District
1976 establishments in Ukraine